Paul Müller (11 October 1940 – 30 May 2010) was a German professor of biology at the University of Trier. He was born in Gersweiler and died in Saarland.

The focus of his work was biogeography, in particular in the Neotropics. His Ph.D. work was on birds and other vertebrates of the Ilha de São Sebastião (Brazil). Subsequently, his studies focussed on herpetofauna, tropical ecology and sustainability of hunting.

Awards
 Ordre national du mérite (1984)
 Bundesverdienstkreuz (1994)
 Honorary Doctorate of Chiang Mai University (1988)
 Honorary Doctorate of Yokohama National University (1989)

See also
 Jürgen Haffer

References

1940 births
2010 deaths
Academic staff of the University of Trier
Recipients of the Cross of the Order of Merit of the Federal Republic of Germany
Biogeographers